Walter Lawson may refer to:
 Walter I. Lawson, U.S. Army Air Force/U.S. Air Force officer
 Walter C. Lawson, lawyer and political figure in New Brunswick, Canada